Aoife O'Donovan (born November 18, 1982) is an American singer and Grammy award-winning songwriter. She is best known as the lead singer for the string band Crooked Still and she also co-founded the Grammy Award-winning female folk trio I'm with Her. She has released three critically acclaimed studio albums: Fossils (2013), In the Magic Hour (2016), and Age of Apathy (2022, nominated for the Best Folk Album Grammy Award), as well as multiple noteworthy live recordings and EPs, including Blue Light (2010), Peachstone (2012), Man in a Neon Coat: Live From Cambridge (2016), In the Magic Hour: Solo Sessions (2019), and Bull Frog's Croon (and Other Songs) (2020). She also spent a decade contributing to the radio variety shows Live from Here and A Prairie Home Companion. Her first professional engagement was singing lead for the folk group The Wayfaring Strangers.

O'Donovan has performed with the Boston Pops Orchestra, the Kansas City Symphony, the National Symphony Orchestra, the Louisville Orchestra, and the Utah Symphony Orchestra. In 2012, she sang on most of the tracks on the album Be Still by the jazz group the Dave Douglas Quintet, featuring trumpeter Dave Douglas. During the summer of 2013, she toured with Garrison Keillor and his A Prairie Home Companion Radio Romance Tour. She also performed at the Roskilde Festival in Denmark 2014. In summer 2017, she joined Garrison Keillor's Prairie Home "Love and Comedy" Tour.

She has performed, recorded and collaborated with a large variety of acclaimed musicians including Ollabelle, Karan Casey and Seamus Egan, Jerry Douglas, Jim Lauderdale, Darol Anger, Sarah Jarosz, Sara Watkins, Christina Courtin, Chris Thile (Nickel Creek, Punch Brothers), Noam Pikelny (Punch Brothers), Edgar Meyer, Stuart Duncan, Greensky Bluegrass, Kronos Quartet and Yo-Yo Ma. Her songwriting has also led her to be featured in films and television and came to the attention of Alison Krauss, who recorded Aoife's song "Lay My Burden Down" on her album Paper Airplane (2011 Rounder Records) and is used in the film Get Low (2010 Sony Pictures). She has had songs placed on True Blood (HBO) and Private Practice (ABC).

Life and career
O'Donovan grew up in Newton, Massachusetts. She spent her summers in Ireland singing songs with her extended family. She became interested in American folk music through artists such as Joan Baez and Bob Dylan. Aoife went on to study contemporary improvisation at the New England Conservatory of Music, where she graduated in 2003. In 2016, she wed Eric Jacobsen; subsequently they had a daughter Ivy Jo, born in 2017.

Crooked Still
O'Donovan and Corey DiMario met at the New England Conservatory of Music in Boston, Massachusetts, in the spring of 2001. Former cellist Rushad Eggleston, who was studying at Berklee College of Music, and Gregory Liszt, a graduate student at MIT, were playing music together around the same time, and when the four met that summer, they formed the band Crooked Still. The group grew in popularity by playing Boston area venues. The group was invited to perform at the Newport Folk Festival and Falcon Ridge Folk Festival, the same year they released their debut album, Hop High. Crooked Still has toured in 23 states and several countries. In August 2006, the group released their second album, Shaken by a Low Sound. In November 2007, cellist Rushad Eggleston parted ways with the band to pursue his own music. In January 2008 two new members joined the band: cellist Tristan Clarridge and fiddler Brittany Haas. The band released its first album with the new lineup Still Crooked in 2008, a live album in 2009, a studio full-length Some Strange Country in 2010 and an EP Friends of Fall in October 2011.

Sometymes Why
Contemporary/neo-traditional folk noir trio Sometymes Why was formed in 2005 by O'Donovan, Kristin Andreassen and Ruth Ungar Merenda. They came together from other bands, including Uncle Earl the Jolly Bankers (Andreassen), Crooked Still, the Wild Band of Snee, the Wayfaring Strangers (O'Donovan), The Mammals and Jay Ungar & Molly Mason's Family Band (Merenda). Sometymes Why released their debut cd in 2005 titled Sometimes Why, followed by Your Heart Is A Glorious Machine in 2009.

Since 2010
In June 2010, O'Donovan released her first solo recording, Blue Light, in the form of a limited edition 7" vinyl.

O'Donovan is the guest vocalist on the 2013 Grammy winning The Goat Rodeo Sessions (2011 Sony Masterworks), an album recorded by cellist Yo-Yo Ma, bassist Edgar Meyer, mandolinist Chris Thile and fiddler Stuart Duncan. The album includes two vocal tracks featuring O'Donovan and Chris Thile. O'Donovan co-wrote one of those tracks, "Here And Heaven", with Meyer, Thile and Duncan.

In November 2012, Aoife signed a deal with Yep Roc Records. A single, "Red & White & Blue & Gold" was released April 2, 2013, and her full-length debut album, "Fossils", produced by Tucker Martine, was released on June 11, 2013.

Aoife has toured with the Punch Brothers, Transatlantic Sessions, the Milk Carton Kids, Elephant Revival, The Goat Rodeo Sessions and The Lone Bellow, makes frequent appearances on Chris Thile's Live From Here as well as headlining performances both in the US and abroad.

In 2015, Aoife toured extensively with Sara Watkins (a founding member of Nickel Creek) and Sarah Jarosz under the combined tour banner of "I'm With Her". This combo came about after an impromptu performance at the 2014 Telluride Bluegrass Festival. The trio released their debut album See You Around on Rounder Records in 2018.

In 2016, Aoife released her sophomore solo studio album on Yep Roc Records, titled In The Magic Hour. On September 9, she also released the live album Man In A Neon Coat: Live From Cambridge, also on Yep Roc Records.

In 2018, Aoife wrote and recorded an original song titled "Are You There" for Elizabeth Chomko's short-film What They Had starring Hilary Swank.

In 2019, Aoife and her band I'm with Her won a Grammy Award for Best American Roots Song for their song "Call My Name".

In 2020, Aoife released her string quartet EP, Bullfrog's Croon (and Other Songs).  As a solo artist she was inter alia part of the Newport Folk Festival in July 2021.

In 2022, O'Donovan released Age of Apathy, a solo record produced by Joe Henry with guest performances by Allison Russell and Madison Cunningham. In November 2022, it received a Grammy nomination for Best Folk Album.

O'Donovan lives in Brooklyn, New York.

Discography

Solo recordings

With Sometymes Why

With Crooked Still

With I'm With Her

Videos

As guest artist

Awards and Nominations

References

External links
Aoife O'Donovan Official website
 
 
Crooked Still
 
 
Sometymes Why
 
 
I'm With Her (group) official website

American folk singers
American women singer-songwriters
Singer-songwriters from New York (state)
American people of Irish descent
Living people
1982 births
Musicians from Boston
New England Conservatory alumni
21st-century American singers
21st-century American women singers
I'm with Her (band) members
Sometymes Why members
Crooked Still members
Yep Roc Records artists
Sugar Hill Records artists
Signature Sounds artists
American expatriates in Ireland
Singer-songwriters from Massachusetts